Massala is a village and rural commune in the Cercle of Ségou in the Ségou Region of southern-central Mali. The commune includes 8 villages in an area of approximately 89 square kilometers. In the 2009 census it had a population of 6,547.

References

External links
.
.

Communes of Ségou Region